Narre Warren railway station is located on the Pakenham line in Victoria, Australia. It serves the south-eastern Melbourne suburb of Narre Warren, and opened on 10 March 1882.

History
Narre Warren station opened on 10 March 1882 as a single platform, just over four years after the railway line from Dandenong was extended to Pakenham. Like the suburb itself, the station was named after an Indigenous word believed to mean 'small hills'.

In 1956, the line between Dandenong and Narre Warren was duplicated, with duplication to Berwick provided in 1962. As part of the duplication to Berwick, an island platform was provided, as well as boom barriers replacing interlocked gates at the Webb Street level crossing which, at the time, was located at the down end of the station.

In 1970, a crossover between No. 2 and No.3 roads was abolished. In 1974, flashing light signals were provided at the former Cranbourne Road level crossing, which was located nearby in the down direction of the station. In 1978, the waiting room at the original station was demolished.

In 1986, boom barriers were provided at the Cranbourne Road level crossing. By 1988, No. 2 road was booked out of use, as well as points at each end of the road and a crossover at the up end of the station. In 1989, the signal box was abolished.

On 2 June 1995, the station was relocated to the east side of the Webb Street level crossing, and reopened to the public the following day.

In October 2003, Narre Warren was upgraded to a Premium Station. In 2004, the Cranbourne Road level crossing was grade separated by being replaced with a road underpass.

On 29 July 2021, the Level Crossing Removal Project announced that the Webb Street level crossing would be grade separated by 2025, with a rail over road "hybrid" design. Webb Street was to be lowered and a rail bridge built over the road, with the station to be rebuilt as part of those works. However, on 14 January 2022, the LXRP announced that the "hybrid" design would be replaced with a rail over road design, removing the need to lower Webb Street. On 23 August of that year, final designs for the level crossing removal and rebuilt station were released.

Platforms, facilities and services
Narre Warren has one island platform with two faces. It is located east of the Webb Street level crossing, which also provides station access. A semi-large fibro building is located at the Flinders Street (Up) end of the station, which houses an enclosed waiting area, toilets and ticket facilities. There is a myki ticket vending machine inside the waiting area, which is able to top up and dispense cards. There is also a small café located next to the entrance of the building, which is open during the morning peak-hour, selling coffee and newspapers. A Protective Service Officers' (PSO) pod is located next to the station building, which is used from 6.00pm until the last service every day.

Narre Warren is served by Pakenham line trains. On average, there are three off-peak services per hour on weekdays, travelling to and from Flinders Street, with more frequent services during peak-hours, and three services an hour on weekends.

Platform 1:
  all stations and limited express services to Flinders Street

Platform 2:
  all stations services to Pakenham

By late 2025, it is planned that trains on the Pakenham line will be through-routed with those on the Sunbury line, via the new Metro Tunnel.

Transport links
Cranbourne Transit operates one route via Narre Warren station, under contract to Public Transport Victoria:
 : Narre Warren South – Westfield Fountain Gate

Ventura Bus Lines operates three routes via Narre Warren station, under contract to Public Transport Victoria:
 : to Berwick station (loop service via Berwick North and Narre Warren South)
 : to Berwick station (loop service via Narre Warren South and Berwick North)
 : Narre Warren North – Cranbourne

References

External links
 Melway map

Premium Melbourne railway stations
Railway stations in Melbourne
Railway stations in Australia opened in 1882
Railway stations in the City of Casey